The State Register of Heritage Places is maintained by the Heritage Council of Western Australia. , 38 places are heritage-listed in the Shire of Wiluna, of which two are on the State Register of Heritage Places.

List
The Western Australian State Register of Heritage Places, lists the following two state-registered places within the Shire of Wiluna:

References

Wiluna
Heritage
Wiluna